A tart is a pastry dish, usually sweet in flavor, with an open top.

Tart may also refer to:

Common meanings
 Tart, a sharp, sour, or acidic flavor
 Slang for a prostitute or more generally a woman who is promiscuous or dresses or acts in a sexually provocative way

Arts and entertainment
 Tart (film), a 2001 film
 Tart (Tokyo Mew Mew), a fictional character in the anime and manga series Tokyo Mew Mew
 tART Artist Collective, a feminist and artist collective based in New York City

People
Charles Tart (born 1937), American psychologist
Indrek Tart (born 1946), Estonian sociologist and literary scientist
Josh Quong Tart (born 1975), Australian actor
Levern Tart (1942–2010), American basketball player
Mei Quong Tart (1850–1903), Chinese-Australian businessman

Other uses
The Tart, a British satirical newspaper 
Tart, Côte-d'Or, a commune in the Côte-d'Or department in eastern France
TART Trail, a cycle and walking track on disused railway lines in Michigan

See also
List of pies, tarts and flans

Joseph Israël Tarte (1848–1907), Canadian politician and journalist.
Donna Tartt, American writer